The 1963 Nippon Professional Baseball season was the fourteenth season of operation of Nippon Professional Baseball (NPB).

Regular season

Standings

Postseason

Japan Series

League leaders

Central League

Pacific League

Awards
Most Valuable Player
Shigeo Nagashima, Yomiuri Giants (CL)
Katsuya Nomura, Nankai Hawks (PL)
Rookie of the Year
No CL recipient
No PL recipient
Eiji Sawamura Award
Yoshiaki Ito, Yomiuri Giants (CL)

See also
1963 Major League Baseball season

References